Farideh Oladghobad is an Iranian educator and reformist politician who is currently a member of the Parliament of Iran, representing Tehran, Rey, Shemiranat and Eslamshahr electoral district.

Career 
Oladghobad is a teacher training expert in Ministry of Education.

Electoral history

References

1970 births
Living people
People from Kuhdasht
Iranian educators
Members of the 10th Islamic Consultative Assembly
Members of the Women's fraction of Islamic Consultative Assembly
University of Tehran alumni